The 1945 United Kingdom general election in Northern Ireland was held on 5 July as part of the wider general election. There were ten constituencies, seven single-seat constituencies with elected by FPTP and three two-seat constituencies with MPs elected by bloc voting.

Results
This was the first general election to Westminster in ten years, as elections had been postponed for the duration of World War II.

In the election as a whole, the Conservative Party government, which included the Ulster Unionists, lost out to the Labour Party, and Sir Winston Churchill was succeeded as Prime Minister by Clement Attlee.

MPs elected

Footnotes

References

Northern Ireland
1945
1945 elections in Northern Ireland
July 1945 events in the United Kingdom